Chu Ki-Young (born March 4, 1977) is a retired male javelin thrower from South Korea, who represented his native country at the 1996 Summer Olympics in Atlanta, Georgia. He set his personal best (78.92 metres) on May 2, 2002 at a meet in Gimcheon.

Achievements

References

sports-reference

1977 births
Living people
South Korean male javelin throwers
Athletes (track and field) at the 1996 Summer Olympics
Olympic athletes of South Korea
Athletes (track and field) at the 2002 Asian Games
Athletes (track and field) at the 2006 Asian Games
Asian Games competitors for South Korea
Competitors at the 1997 Summer Universiade